Chairman of the Soviet of the Union was the presiding officer of the Soviet of the Union, the lower chamber of the Supreme Soviet of the Soviet Union.

List of office-holders

Source:

See also
List of Chairmen of the Soviet of Nationalities

References

Government of the Soviet Union
Soviet Union, Soviet of the Union
Politics of the Soviet Union

Supreme Soviet of the Soviet Union